Malik & the O.Gs is a spoken-word performance band based in Liverpool. Its founder Malik Al Nasir put the band together in 2006 when he first recorded his poetry to music for his debut album Rhythms of the Diaspora Vol 1 & 2, which was released in on Mentis Records featuring Gil Scott-Heron and The Last Poets′ Jalal Mansur Nuriddin. Malik produced the album in 2006 and Malik & the O.G's produced a video with Emmy Award-winning Director Mitchell Stuart for the song from the album Africa, an adaptation of one of the poems of the same name in Malik's book Ordinary Guy.

Roots
Malik & the O.G's was born out of the political poetry movement that was rooted in the civil rights era in America. In 1984 Gil Scott-Heron toured the UK and met Malik Al Nasir backstage at a concert.

 Scott-Heron then trained Malik Al Nasir over a period spanning more than 20 years as a poet and also in the politics of the civil rights era. Jalal Mansur Nuriddin (of The Last Poets) wrote the foreword to the book Ordinary Guy, which was a  tribute to Scott-Heron. In 2006 Malik recorded Rhythms of the Diaspora Vol 1 & 2, his debut album, with Gil Scott-Heron and Jalal of The Last Poets under his band name Malik & the O.G's. The double album was released in August 2015 on MentiS RecordS, followed by the Africa EP, on the same label in 2017.

Appearances
Malik & the O.G's also featured in a documentary, Word up – From Ghetto to Mecca, with political black poets Gil Scott-Heron, Jalal Mansur Nuriddin of The Last Poets and UK Dub poet Benjamin Zephaniah, as well as Rod Youngs (drummer from The Amnesia Express). The film premiered at the Phoenix Cinema in Leicester, UK, in 2011 as part of the "Black History Season" dedicated to the late Gil Scott-Heron. It is shown as part of a double bill with the XL Recordings film 'Who is Gil Scott-Heron?' at FACT Cinema Liverpool 22 August 2015.

In 2011 Malik & the O.G's were invited to perform at Judith E. Wilson's Drama Studio at Cambridge University. The band at that time included Malik Al Nasir lead vocal, Rod Youngs (Gil Scott-Heron's Amnesia Express), Cambridge-based bass player Tiago Coimbra, Senegalese percussionist Makhou and engineer Tom Parker.

In 2013 Malik & the O.G's were invited by Liverpool City Council to perform their poetry at the inauguration of Liverpool International Music Festival, where the band was placed on the "It's Liverpool – Legends" stage. After the festival Malik was asked to perform some anti-war poetry for online TV station Bay TV where he delivered the politically charged poem "Shock & Awe", performed at the Liverpool International Music Festival, which is based on Gil Scott-Heron's anti-war protest song "Re-Ron".

In  Feb' 2014 Malik & the O.G's supported Jalal of The Last Poets at the  live performance of "Hustlers Convention" at the Jazz Café in London. with Jazz Warriors – Cleveland Watkiss, Hawi Gondwe (Amy Winehouse Band) and Orphy Robinson (Don Cherry Band) The sold out performance was filmed for a documentary on Hustlers Convention commissioned by Chuck D of Public Enemy .

Malik & The O.G's produced a series of tribute events  to Gil Scott-Heron in 2015 including "Poets Against Apartheid -The Legacy of Gil Scott-Heron" as part of UNESCO International Slavery Remembrance Day commemorations in partnership with Liverpool International Slavery Museum. The event featured spoken word performances from Malik Al Nasir, Tayo Aluko and Jean Binta Breeze (MBE), also "The Revolution Will Be Live!" with business partner Richard McGinnis, this event was commissioned as part of Liverpool International Music Festival 2015 and featured Talib Kweli, The Christians, Craig Charles, Malik & the O.G's, Cleveland Watkiss and others. The show was filmed at St Georges Hall on 27 Aug 2015.

Bibliography

"Gil Scott-Heron Saved My Life" Abdul Malik Al Nasir (as told to Simon Hattenstone), The Guardian, 19 June 2011.
"Malik & The O.G's 2014" by Mike 'The Dood' Edwards, UK Vibe Magazine March 2014.
"Interview with Malik & the O.G's" by Sunny Sharma D, I Am Hip-Hop Magazine 7 February 2014
"Gil Scott-Heron: the revolution lives on" Paul Lester, The Guardian, 26 August 2015.
"How Gil Scott-Heron changed my life" Emily Jupp, The Independent, 21 August 2015.
"Gil Scott-Heron Tribute Night" Chris Tang, Jocks & Nerds, 18 August 2015.
"No Re-Run, Brother: Gil Scott-Heron celebrated at Liverpool International Music Festival" Tom Short , The Skinny, 6 August 2015.
"Malik & The O.G's" Glyn Akroyd , Bido Lito, Issue 58, August 2015.

Radio appearances

BBC World Service, Outlook Extraordinary personal stories from around the world. with Matthew Bannister, Broadcast, Mon 27 Jun 2011 14:32 GMT, Mon 27 Jun 2011 19:32 GMT, Mon 27 Jun 2011 23:32 GMT, Tue 28 Jun 2011, 01:32 GMT, Tue 28 Jun 2011 10:05 GMT.
BBC Radio 4, Saturday Live with Claire Balding and Al Jarreau.
BBC Radio 5 Live, "Up all Night" with Dotun Adebayo Broadcast, Sunday 20 Nov 2011
BBC Radio Leicester, 104.9 fm "Dulcie Dixon Show"  with Erol Melbourne, Broadcast Sunday 2 October 2011

Filmography

Word Up – From Ghetto To Mecca, Film Premiere, Phoenix Cinema, Leicester, UK.
BBC News, "Liverpool riots - caused by government cuts", with Ed Thomas.
Hustlers Convention Documentary, released at Docfest Sheffield July 2015.
Bay TV, News, August 2015.
Who is Gil Scott-Heron Documentary, released in the UK August 2015.

Discography

Collaboration albums

Collaboration album credits

Larry McDonald (percussionist), "Drumquestra"  MCPR Music 2009 (Cat No: CPLM301)

References

Musical groups from Liverpool
English spoken word artists